Grand Canyon most often refers to:
Grand Canyon of the Colorado River, Arizona, United States 
Grand Canyon National Park, surrounding the canyon
Grand Canyon Village, Arizona, a community within the national park

Grand Canyon may also refer to:

Arts and entertainment
  Grand Canyon of the Colorado River, a 1892-1908 painting by Thomas Moran
  The Grand Canyon of the Yellowstone (1872), a 1872 painting by Thomas Moran
 The Grand Canyon of the Yellowstone (1893-1901 painting), a 1893-1901 painting by Thomas Moran
 Grand Canyon (1949 film), an American Western
 Grand Canyon (1958 film), a Disney documentary film
 Grand Canyon (1991 film), an American drama film 
 Grand Canyon: The Hidden Secrets, a 1984 IMAX documentary
 Grand Canyon (book), a 2017 children's picture book by Jason Chin
 Grand Canyon: A Different View, 2003 book edited by Tom Vail
 Grand Canyon Suite, a 1931 suite for orchestra by Ferde Grofé
 "Grand Canyon", a song by Puscifer from the 2015 album Money Shot
 "Grand Canyon", a song by The Magnetic Fields from their 1999 album 69 Love Songs

Places
 Grand Canyon (Greenland)
 Grand Canyon (Missouri), U.S.
 Grand Canyon of the Elwha, Washington, U.S.
 Grand Canyon of the Fraser, British Columbia, Canada 
 Grand Canyon of the Nechako, British Columbia, Canada 
 Grand Canyon of the Pacific, Hawaiian Islands of the U.S.
 Grand Canyon of Pennsylvania, or Pine Creek Gorge, Pennsylvania, U.S.
 Grand Canyon of the Stikine, British Columbia, Canada
 Grand Canyon of the Tuolumne, California, U.S.
 Grand Canyon of the Yellowstone, Wyoming, U.S.
 Valles Marineris, on Mars, is also known as the Grand Canyon

Other
 Grand Canyon Airlines, an American airline
 Grand Canyon Limited, a train of the Atchison, Topeka & Santa Fe Railway 1929–1971
 Grand Canyon (mall), in Haifa, Israel
 Grand Canyon University, in Phoenix, Arizona, U.S.

See also

 Grand Canyon Airport (disambiguation)
 , a U.S. Navy reserve ship
 Valles Marineris, a system of canyons on Mars
 Verdon Gorge, in the Provence-Alpes-Côte d'Azur region, France